Manuel Alexander Heredia Rojas (born 9 January 1986) is a Peruvian footballer who plays as a goalkeeper for Carlos A. Mannucci.

Club career
Manuel Heredia came from the youth division at Sporting Cristal, completing in 2003. In 2006, he was transferred to Coronel Bolognesi.

In 2008, he was loaned out to his former club, Sporting Cristal for the first half of the year. After the 2008 season, he transferred to Sporting Cristal.

International career
Heredia made his debut for the Peru national team in 2009.

Honours

Club
Coronel Bolognesi FC
 Clausura: 2007

Carlos A. Mannucci
 Copa Bicentenario; Runner Up 2021

Personal life
Manuel married his wife, Lindsay Smith, in 2010.

References

External links

1986 births
Living people
Footballers from Lima
Peruvian footballers
Peruvian expatriate footballers
Peru international footballers
Sporting Cristal footballers
Coronel Bolognesi footballers
Total Chalaco footballers
Cienciano footballers
Club Alianza Lima footballers
Universidad Técnica de Cajamarca footballers
Carlos A. Mannucci players
Peruvian Primera División players
Peruvian Segunda División players
Association football goalkeepers
Peruvian expatriate sportspeople in the United States
Expatriate soccer players in the United States